Shelley Nicola Longworth (born 22 March 1976) is a British actress. She is best known for playing the role of Sam Wood in Benidorm, from 2011 to 2012 and from 2017 to 2018.

Career
In 2010, she joined the cast of Benidorm for the fourth series playing loud-mouthed Sam Wood. She returned for the fifth series in 2012 and then departed from the show. In 2016, it was confirmed that Longworth would reprise her role as Sam for the ninth series, the first episode of which aired on 1 March 2017. She has appeared in the comedy sketch shows Tittybangbang on BBC Three and Angelo's on Five, voiced characters in the children's show Fimbles, and starred in her own comedy series with her brother Adam Longworth, It's Adam and Shelley, which was broadcast on BBC Three in 2007. She played Ms Wall in Bad Girls in 1999, featuring in two episodes.

Filmography

External links
ShelleyLongworth.com (Adobe Flash)

1976 births
Living people
English television actresses
English voice actresses
Actors from Doncaster
20th-century English actresses
21st-century English actresses